Djebedji (from Turkish Cebeci) was a military subunit of Ottoman Army's artillery corps.

Foundation 
Foundation date of the unit is not known, but it appears that the Djebedji unit was founded in the 15th century. It was one of the privileged units of the Ottoman army. They were considered as a part of the Janissary and based on devshirme system. Their commander was called Cebecibaşı. The unit was small and selected, numbering no more than 625 men in 1574.

Duties 
The Djebedji unit was in charge of maintenance and keeping the weaponry. They were also responsible in transporting weapons to where they were needed. During peace times, they kept the weaponry in arsenals named cephane. The Djebedji unit participated in all campaigns commanded by the sultan or the grand vizier. In other campaigns only a part of the unit participated.

Abolishment 
In most Istanbul revolts during the stagnation and decline periods of the Ottoman Empire, the Djebedji units acted together with the Janissary, and in 1826, when the Janissary was abolished by Sultan Mahmud II following the Auspicious Incident, Djebedji units were also abolished.

References 

Military units and formations disestablished in 1826
Warfare of the Middle Ages
Military units and formations of the Ottoman Empire
Turkish words and phrases
15th-century establishments in the Ottoman Empire
Janissaries